Ioannis Kiousis (born 3 March 1945) is a Greek sailor. He competed in the Dragon event at the 1972 Summer Olympics.

References

External links
 

1945 births
Living people
Greek male sailors (sport)
Olympic sailors of Greece
Sailors at the 1972 Summer Olympics – Dragon
Place of birth missing (living people)
Mediterranean Games gold medalists for Greece